Bert Trahair (30 August 1891 – 11 September 1953) was an Australian rules footballer who played for the Melbourne Football Club in the Victorian Football League (VFL).

Notes

External links 

 

1891 births
Australian rules footballers from Victoria (Australia)
Melbourne Football Club players
South Bendigo Football Club players
1953 deaths